Glenarbon is a rural locality in the Goondiwindi Region, Queensland, Australia. It is on the border of Queensland and New South Wales.

Geography 
The north-east and south-east of the locality is within the Yelarbon State Forest which extends into Beebo to the south-east and west and into Brush Creek to the east.

History 
Glenarbon Provision School opened on 17 March 1933, becoming Glenarbon State School in 1940. It closed in 1982. The school was located just to the south of the Texas Yelarbon Road at  within the present-day boundaries of Beebo.

St Paul's Lutheran Church was established circa December 1959. 

Amenities 
The former school site is now a recreational reserve operated by the Goondiwindi Regional Council.

The church has a small cemetery.

References

Further reading

External links 

Goondiwindi Region
Localities in Queensland